Eric Iván Jesús Ramírez (born 21 September 1996) is an Argentine professional footballer who plays as a forward for Club de Gimnasia y Esgrima La Plata.

Career
Ramírez had youth spells with River Plate, Club Salto Grande and Gimnasia y Esgrima. He debuted professionally for Gimnasia y Esgrima in the Argentine Primera División during the 2015 campaign, coming on as a late substitute for Antonio Medina in a 2–3 home defeat to former club River Plate on 29 March. One further appearance in 2015 followed eight months later, he again came on as a substitute in a 5–1 play-off win over San Martín on 20 November. Quilmes signed Ramírez on loan in August 2018.

Personal life
Ramírez has a footballing brother in Agustín Ramírez, who also made the breakthrough via Gimnasia y Esgrima's academy.

Career statistics
.

References

External links

1996 births
Living people
People from Concordia, Entre Ríos
Argentine footballers
Association football forwards
Argentine Primera División players
Primera Nacional players
Club de Gimnasia y Esgrima La Plata footballers
Quilmes Atlético Club footballers
Sportspeople from Entre Ríos Province